Dennstaedtia is a mostly tropical and subtropical genus of ferns described as a genus in 1801.  Hayscented fern, or Cup ferns, are common names for some species in this genus.  Its best-known member is probably the temperate North-American hay-scented fern, Dennstaedtia punctilobula (pictured in the taxobox), which forms extensive clonal ground-cover colonies on level surfaces in the Appalachian area.

Some characteristics of Dennstaedtia:"Fronds homomorphic; stipe grooved above, hairy when young... lamina triangular to oblong, many times pinnate, usually densely hairy, especially on rachis... Veins free, pinnately branching, veinlet not reaching margin, with hydathode at apex. Sori orbicular, marginal, terminal on each veinlet, separate..."

Species

Species include:

D. ampla 
D. anthriscifolia 
D. antillensis 
D. appendiculata 
D. arborescens 
D. bipinnata 
D. canaliculata 
†D. christophelii  (Ypresian, NW North America)
D. cicutaria 
D. coronata 
D. cuneata 
D. d'orbignyana 
D. davallioides 
D. delicata 
D. dennstaedtioides 
D. deparioides 
D. dissecta 
D. distenta 
D. elmeri 
D. flaccida 
D. fluminensis 
D. fusca 
D. glabrata 
D. glauca 
D. globulifera 
D. hirsuta 
D. hooveri 
D. incisa 
D. inermis 
D. kalbreyeri 
D. leptophylla 
D. lindsayiformis 
D. macgregori 
D. madagascariensis 
D. magnifica 
D. melanostipos 
D. merrillii 
D. novoguineensis 
D. obtusifolia 
D. parksii 
D. penicillifera 
D. philippinensis 
D. producta 
D. punctilobula 
D. remota 
D. resinifera 
D. rufidula 
D. samoensis 
D. scabra 
D. shawii 
D. smithii 
D. spinosa 
D. sprucei 
D. sumatrana 
D. terminalis 
D. tripinnatifida 
D. vagans 
D. wercklei 
D. williamsii

References

External links 

 Genus Dennstaedtia world species list

 
Dennstaedtiaceae
Fern genera